Lithophane semiusta, the singed pinion, is a species of dart moth in the family Noctuidae. This is found in North America.

The MONA or Hodges number for Lithophane semiusta is 9885.

References

Further reading

 
 
 

semiusta
Articles created by Qbugbot
Moths described in 1874